Women's Slalom World Cup 1988/1989

Calendar

Final point standings

In Women's Slalom World Cup 1988/89 all results count.

External links
fis-ski.com

World Cup
FIS Alpine Ski World Cup slalom women's discipline titles